Prince Oscar of Sweden, Duke of Skåne (Oscar Carl Olof; born 2 March 2016) is the younger child and only son of Crown Princess Victoria and her husband Prince Daniel. He is a grandson of King Carl XVI Gustaf and Queen Silvia and is third in the line of succession to the Swedish throne, after his mother and his sister, Princess Estelle.

Birth
Prince Oscar was born on 2 March 2016 at Karolinska University Hospital in Solna. His birth was greeted by two 21-gun salutes on the island of Skeppsholmen, opposite Stockholm Palace. His names and title of Duke of Skåne were announced the following day by his maternal grandfather, the King. 

A Te Deum thanksgiving service was held in the palace's Royal Chapel on 3 March 2016 to celebrate his birth.

Prince Oscar was christened on 27 May 2016 at the Royal Chapel of Stockholm Palace in Stockholm, Sweden. His godparents are Crown Prince Frederik of Denmark; Crown Princess Mette-Marit of Norway; his maternal aunt Princess Madeleine of Sweden; his mother's cousin Oscar Magnuson; and his father's cousin Hans Åström. He was christened in the family's antique christening gown which was first worn by Prince Gustaf Adolf when he was christened in 1906. His name and date of christening were added in embroidery to the gown.

Titles, styles, honours, and arms

Titles and styles
Oscar's full title is: His Royal Highness Prince Oscar Carl Olof, Duke of Skåne.

Honours
 Knight of the Royal Order of the Seraphim
 Knight of the Order of Charles XIII

References

External links 
 Royal Court of Sweden - Prince Oscar

|-

2016 births
Living people
People from Solna Municipality
House of Bernadotte
Swedish people of German descent
Swedish people of Brazilian descent
Royal children
Swedish princes
Dukes of Skåne
Knights of the Order of Charles XIII
Swedish people of Forest Finnish descent